Heart of Flame is a 1915 American silent short drama film directed by Tom Ricketts, starring Vivian Rich, David Lythgoe and Harry von Meter.

Cast
 Vivian Rich as Zira, a mountain girl
 David Lythgoe as Gordon Keith
 Jack Richardson as Checo
 Charlotte Burton as Beppa
 Louise Lester as Nita
 Harry von Meter as Von Erzforf
 Reeves Eason
 William Vaughn

External links

1915 films
1915 drama films
Silent American drama films
American silent short films
American black-and-white films
1915 short films
Films directed by Tom Ricketts
1910s American films